Lolita (or ) is a female given name of Spanish origin. It is the diminutive form of Lola, a hypocorism of Dolores, which means "sorrows" or "pains" in Spanish.

Popularity
According to the United States Social Security Administration, the popularity of the name Lolita peaked in the United States in 1963, when it was the 467th most popular female name. The SSA has not ranked Lolita in the top 1000 most popular female names given since 1973,
and in the 1990 United States census, Lolita was ranked the 969th most frequent female name out of 4,275 unique names.

The name remains popular in some other countries, e.g. Latvia where its name day is 30 May.

Notable people named Lolita

Lolita Ananasova (born 1992), Ukrainian swimmer
Lolita Ayala (born 1951), Mexican journalist
Lolita Carbon (born 1952), Filipino singer, member of Asin (band).
Lolita Chakrabarti (born 1969), British actress
Lolita Chammah (born 1983), French actress
Lolita Čigāne (born 1973), Latvian politician
Lolita Davidovich (born 1961), Canadian actress
Lolita de la Colina (born 1948), Mexican singer
Lolita Einzinger (1931–2010), Austrian singer
Lolita Files (born 1963), American writer
Lolita Flores (born 1958), Spanish actress and singer
Lolita Kreivaitienė (born 1960), Lithuanian designer
Lolita Lebrón (1919–2010), Puerto Rican political activist
Lolita Lempicka (born 1954), French fashion designer
Lolita Milyavskaya (born 1963), Russian singer and actress
Lolita Morena (born 1960), Swiss actress
Lolita Pille (born 1982), French writer
Lolita Ritmanis (born 1962), Latvian-American composer
Lolita Rodrigues (born 1929), Brazilian actress
Lolita Rodriguez (born 1935), Filipino actress
Lolita Sevilla (1935–2013), Spanish actress
Lolita Tizol (1890–1933), Puerto Rican educator
Lolita Torres (1930–2002), Argentine actress
Lolita Yermak (born 1996), Ukrainian ice dancer

People known as Lolita
Amy Fisher (born 1974), American woman known as "the Long Island Lolita"

Fictional characters
Lolita, 12-year-old Dolores Haze in Vladimir Nabokov's 1955 novel Lolita. (Nabokov commented, "I am probably responsible for the odd fact that people don't seem to name their daughters Lolita any more. I have heard of young female poodles being given that name since 1956, but of no human beings.")
Lolita Pulido, the central female character of Johnston McCulley's 1919 novel The Curse of Capistrano, adapted to film in 1920, 1940 and 1974 as The Mark of Zorro; in the 1974 version her given name was changed to Teresa to avoid confusion with the Nabokov character, whose name had by that time become a byword for a sexually precocious nymphet.

Usage as a word
The name is sometimes used as a term to indicate a sexually precocious girl, due to its association with the title character of Vladimir Nabokov's 1955 novel Lolita and its film adaptations in 1962 and 1997. A UK retail chain was criticised in January 2008 for branding as "Lolita" a bed aimed at young girls.

Related

See also
Lolita (disambiguation)
Lolita, a 1955 novel by Vladimir Nabokov
Loleatta Holloway

References

External links
 Dictionary Definitions: Lolita Definitions for the name Lolita

Spanish feminine given names
Italian feminine given names
Latvian feminine given names
Portuguese feminine given names
Filipino feminine given names